Kottarakkara Sree Mahaganapathy Kshethram is a pilgrim centre in South India. It is centuries old and the most important Maha Ganapathi Temple in Kerala. Non-Hindus are permitted. It is the family of Lord Siva. This Ganapati temple is located in Kottarakkara which is 25 km from Kollam.

Temple

The deities of Kottarakkara Sree Mahaganapathy Kshethram are Lord Shiva, Goddess Parvati, Lord Ganesha, Lord Murugan, Lord Ayyappan, and Nagaraja. Even though the main deity is Lord Shiva, the main priority is given to his son Lord Ganesha. All deities except Goddess Parvati and Lord Ganesha face east. The main offerings of the temple are Unniyappam Udayasthamanapooja, Mahaganapathi homam and Pushpanjali. The Unniyappam made here is very famous.

Pooja schedule

Morning
 4:00	Palliyunathal
 4:30	Nadathurakkal
 4.40	Nirmalyam
 4:50	Abhishekam
 5.30	Ashtadravya Ganapathyhomam
 6.00	Usha: Pooja
 7.00	Ethritheu Pooja
 7.15	Sreebali
 9.00	Pantheeradi Pooja
 10:00	Navaka Pooja
 10.30	Ucha Pooja
 11:00	Uchasreebali
 11:30	Nadayadappu

Evening
 5:00	Nadathurappu
 6:30	Deeparadhana
 7:30	Athazhappoja
 7:45	Athazha Sreebali
 8:00	Nadayadappu.

Shri Ganapthy

Ganapathy is the leader of the Ganas, i.e., the leader of groups, tribes, race, army, escorts, and hence Lord Siva's son is described as the supreme leader (Vinayaka). He is also known as Vigneswara — Lord of all obstacles. These names clearly show that He is a master of all Circumstances.

Ganapathy is represented as yellow skinned, short with a big round belly, elephant headed with one trunk, four arms, large ears, bright shining eyes.

There are multiple versions about the origin of Lord Vinayaka. According to the Varahapurana, once upon a time the Devas approached Lord Siva and submitted before him the need of a baby who can do away with all obstacles. With the consent of Parvathy devi, Siva agreed to the proposal. Devi become pregnant and gave birth to a beautiful baby. The ladies of Devalokam gathered around him. Keeping in mind the character of the ladies Parvathy blessed her child with these words: "May your beauty change to that of a tusker headed body with a big belly." Her desire was fulfilled. But Lord Siva, though unhappy, named him Ganesa and he blessed Ganesha saying, "Your position will be above all Ganas. All gods will acknowledge the prominence of Ganesa, and those who are not ready to worship you will fall into deep waters."

The Skandapurana says that Ganapathy was formed from the dirt collected from the body of Goddess Parvathy. Devi created an extraordinary elephant-headed creature with four arms and deputed him to safeguard the entrance towards the Chandraprathishta, which was being performed in heaven.

According to the Padmapurana, Parvathy, like all of God's creations, had the desire to give birth to a son who would be the embodiment of all virtue. For this she prayed to God Vishnu who appeared before her. He granted her wish by taking birth in her womb. The son thus born to Parvathy is Ganapathy.

References

Ganesha temples
Hindu temples in Kollam district
Tourist attractions in Kollam district
108 Shiva Temples